Ronald Wayne Snidow (December 30, 1941 – May 17, 2009) was an American football defensive tackle in the National Football League for the Washington Redskins and the Cleveland Browns.  He attended San Rafael High School in California.  He played college football at the University of Oregon.  The Washington Redskins drafted Snidow in the third round of the 1963 NFL draft.  After five seasons with the Redskins, he was traded to the Cleveland Browns in exchange for a second round draft choice, just prior to the opening of the 1968 season.  Snidow was first-team All-Pro with the Browns in 1969.  He appeared in 126 career regular season games.  After suffering a broken leg while playing with the Browns, he retired at the end of the 1972 season, having played 10 years in the NFL.  After retiring from the NFL, Snidow worked as a commercial real estate broker in Southern California, until he retired.  In 2008, Snidow was diagnosed with Lou Gehrig's disease, which he died from a year later on May 17, 2009, while on a vacation cruise off the coast of Italy on the island of Elba.

References

External links
http://www.nfl.com/players/ronsnidow/profile?id=SNI498348
http://www.pro-football-reference.com/players/S/SnidRo20.htm

1941 births
2009 deaths
Deaths from motor neuron disease
Neurological disease deaths in Tuscany
Sportspeople from Newport News, Virginia
American football defensive tackles
Washington Redskins players
Cleveland Browns players
Oregon Ducks football players